Tomáš Brigant (born 11 October 1994) is a Slovak footballer who plays for MFK Skalica as a winger.

Club career
He was signed by Spartak Trnava in July 2017.

Honours 
Spartak Trnava
 Slovak Super Liga: 2017–18
 Slovak Cup: 2018–19

References

External links
 
 FC Zbrojovka Brno official profile

1994 births
Living people
Slovak footballers
Czech First League players
Slovak Super Liga players
AS Trenčín players
FC Zbrojovka Brno players
Spartak Myjava players
FK Senica players
Partizán Bardejov players
MFK Skalica players
Sportspeople from Považská Bystrica
Association football midfielders